The 1992 Boston University Terriers football team was an American football team that represented Boston University as a member of the Yankee Conference during the 1992 NCAA Division I-AA football season. In their third season under head coach Dan Allen, the Terriers compiled a 3–8 record (2–6 against conference opponents), finished eighth out of nine teams in the Yankee Conference, and were outscored by a total of 352 to 218.

Schedule

References

Boston University
Boston University Terriers football seasons
Boston University Terriers football